Tsai Wan-tsai (5 August 1929 – 5 October 2014) was a Taiwanese banker. Born in modern-day Miaoli, his birth name was 蔡萬財. He is one of the brothers of Tsai Wan-lin, and an uncle of Tsai Hong-tu. Tsai Wan-tsai was a member of the Legislative Yuan, the national parliament of Taiwan. He was also the founder of Fubon Group. In June 2008, Forbes ranked him as the fourth richest of Taiwan, with a net worth of US$5.1 billion.

He died at the age of 85 in 2014. After his death, Fubon established the Tsai Wan-tsai Taiwan Contribution Award in his honor. The company is now run by his sons Daniel Tsai and Richard Tsai.

References

1929 births
2014 deaths
Taiwanese businesspeople
Taiwanese billionaires
Tsai family of Miaoli
Kuomintang Members of the Legislative Yuan in Taiwan
Members of the 1st Legislative Yuan in Taiwan
Politicians of the Republic of China on Taiwan from Miaoli County
Taipei Members of the Legislative Yuan
Party List Members of the Legislative Yuan